Axel Vilhelm Teodor Cadier (13 September 1906 – 29 October 1974) was a Swedish wrestler. He competed in Greco-Roman events at the 1932 and 1936 Summer Olympics and won a bronze and a gold medal, respectively.

Cadier first trained in swimming and boxing, but changed to wrestling at the age 21. Besides his Olympic medals he won four European and 11 national titles in Greco-Roman and freestyle wrestling (1934–1942; 6 in Greco-Roman, 5 in freestyle). In the 1940s–1950s he wrestled professionally in North America. After that he trained the Norwegian national team and worked as an instructor at the French State Sports Institute.

References

External links

 
 

1906 births
1974 deaths
Olympic wrestlers of Sweden
Wrestlers at the 1932 Summer Olympics
Wrestlers at the 1936 Summer Olympics
Swedish male sport wrestlers
Olympic gold medalists for Sweden
Olympic bronze medalists for Sweden
Olympic medalists in wrestling
Medalists at the 1936 Summer Olympics
Medalists at the 1932 Summer Olympics
Stampede Wrestling alumni
People from Varberg
Sportspeople from Halland County
20th-century Swedish people